Schmidt Lake may refer to:

Schmidt Lake (Wright County, Minnesota)
Schmidt Lake (Nova Scotia)